US Post Office-Ithaca is a historic post office building located at Ithaca in Tompkins County, New York.  It was designed and built in 1909 and is one of a number of post offices in New York State designed by the Office of the Supervising Architect of the Treasury Department, James Knox Taylor.

It was listed on the National Register of Historic Places in 1989.

In 2000, the building was rehabilitated and converted into the Ithaca Town Hall. The USPS operates 5000 sq ft of the property as a postal store.

Gallery

References

Ithaca
Neoclassical architecture in New York (state)
Government buildings completed in 1909
Buildings and structures in Ithaca, New York
National Register of Historic Places in Tompkins County, New York